Artist Collection is a compilation album by Australian dance–pop singer Kylie Minogue. It was released by BMG International on 20 September 2004 in the United Kingdom. The album contained songs from Minogue's two Deconstruction Records album's Kylie Minogue (1994) and Impossible Princess (1997), as well as rare songs and B-sides. It was also released as a DVD.

Track listing

External links
Kylie.com — official website
 Artistcollecion.org - Artist Collection Website

References

Kylie Minogue compilation albums
2004 compilation albums
2004 video albums
Music video compilation albums
Kylie Minogue video albums